Smyths Toys Superstores is an Irish multinational chain provider of children's toys and entertainment products with over 200 shops throughout Ireland, the United Kingdom, Germany, Switzerland, Austria, and France. The business is owned by the Smyth family.

The company is headquartered in Lyrr Building 1 in the Mervue Business Park, Galway, Ireland, and it has additional offices in Belfast and London in the United Kingdom.

Group turnover reached €1.465 billion in pandemic-hit 2020 with the majority of sales coming from the U.K. market.

History 
Before it became a toy store it was a newsagents, the newsagents is still in business.

The company is run by four brothers, Tony, Padraig, Liam and Thomas Smyth. Smyths is Ireland's largest toy retailer. The Globe Retail Park in Naas, Ireland was subject to a fire on 27 July 2016 that destroyed one of the shop's stockrooms, causing the shop to temporarily close, with operations being moved until repairs could be made.

Expansion to central Europe 
On 24 April 2018, Smyths acquired Toys "R" Us stores in Germany, Austria, and Switzerland. In 2019, all the stores in those countries were re-branded as such to Smyths. 

In July 2022, Smyths acquired French toy chain PicWicToys in France out of Receivership and taking over 41 stores, 2 warehouses and a head office.

Licensed brands 
 Sonic the Hedgehog
 Super Mario
 Minecraft

Stores and subsidiaries 

In total, Smyths operates over 272 stores across 6 countries: 21 stores in Ireland, 117 in the United Kingdom, 68 in Germany, 16 in Austria, 10 in Switzerland and 41 in France. Smyths Toys UK Limited is a wholly owned subsidiary of the company.

References 

Retail companies established in 1986
Retail companies of Ireland
Retail companies of Europe
Irish companies established in 1986
Galway (city)
Toy_retailers_of_the_United_Kingdom
Privately held companies of Ireland
Toy retailers of Ireland
Superstores